Velikodvorye is a rural locality (a selo) in Posyolok Velikodvorsky, Gus-Khrustalny District, Vladimir Oblast, Russia. The population was 29 as of 2010.

Geography 
Velikodvorye is located 52 km south of Gus-Khrustalny (the district's administrative centre) by road. Velikodvorsky is the nearest rural locality.

References 

Rural localities in Gus-Khrustalny District